Thom Bierdz (born March 25, 1962) is an American actor best known for his portrayal of Phillip Chancellor III on the daytime drama The Young and the Restless.

Career
He appeared on The Young and the Restless, from 1986 to 1989, returning for a "dream sequence" in 2004, and in a surprising twist, returned to the role in May 2009, 2010 and 2011. He was also a recurring guest star on Melrose Place as Sarah's abusive boyfriend, Hank. Other TV credits include guest starred twice on Murder, She Wrote (1994, 1995), Matlock (1993), Robin's Hoods (1994) and Highway to Heaven (1986), Win, Lose or Draw (1989) and The New Hollywood Squares (1988, 1989). Bierdz played Bobby Burton on the web series Old Dogs New Tricks in 2012 and 2013.

Bierdz co-founded American Art Awards in 2008. He has since been president of the prestigious online art competition which annually awards USA's Best Galleries & Museums, and with their critique, awards over 300 artists in 50 categories from over 60 countries. In 2023, he expanded to also launch World Art Awards, a similar online competition.

Filmography

Personal life
Bierdz's ancestry is Polish on his father's side and Italian on his mother's side. He left The Young and the Restless in July 1989 to pursue film roles.

His youngest brother Troy, who had been living with him in Los Angeles, returned to Wisconsin. Shortly thereafter, in July 1989, Troy murdered their mother with a baseball bat and is currently serving a sentence of 50 years without the possibility of parole in a Wisconsin prison. In May 2002, his brother Gregg committed suicide. He has one sister. In 2018, Bierdz appeared in and narrated an episode of Evil Lives Here on the Investigation Discovery (ID) Network, based on his memoir Forgiving Troy. In the show, he recounts his brother Troy's life and his strange behavior leading to his mother's murder.
 
Bierdz is gay. After acting, Bierdz has devoted most of his life to painting. In 2005, he received the 2005 Out Magazine Best Emerging Artist of Los Angeles for painting pictures of cows. He is also the recipient of the Key to the Light Award from The Thalians.

In September 2009, The Human Rights Campaign at a black tie gala themed "Speak Your Truth" presented Bierdz with its Visibility Award for his continued contributions to charity work for human rights through his visual art, acting and writing.

Works 
 
 
 
 Bierdz, Thom (2018). 100 B&W Male Nude Prints & 100 B&W Photos Of The Artist. Thom Bierdz. ISBN 
 
 Bierdz, Thom (2019). The 100 Blue X Cards. Thom Bierdz. 
 Bierdz, Thom (2022). The 12 Days Of Christmas Novella. Thom Bierdz.  
 Bierdz, Thom (2022). How To Look And Feel 20 Years Younger. Thom Bierdz.  
 Bierdz, Thom (2022). Bierdz Art: Volume 1. LANDSCAPES, 12 DAYS OF CHRISTMAS COTTAGES... Thom Bierdz.  
 Bierdz, Thom (2022). Bierdz Art: Volume 2. EXPRESSIONISM…: INCLUDING THE 100 BLUE X PAINTINGS. Thom Bierdz.  
 Bierdz, Thom (2022). Bierdz Art: Volume 3. THE COMPLETE COLOR 'NUDES IN TREES. Thom Bierdz.  
 Bierdz, Thom (2022). Bierdz Art: Volume 4. PEOPLE & PETS: HAVE A CELEBRITY PAINT YOUR LOVED ONES. Thom Bierdz.

References

External links 
 
 
 "Facing the Soap Opera Called Life" (interview with Thom Bierdz)
 Interview with Bierdz on the Feast of Fools Podcast

1962 births
Living people
American male soap opera actors
American male television actors
American gay actors
Actors from Kenosha, Wisconsin
LGBT people from Wisconsin
Gay memoirists
American gay writers